Louis Charles Birch  (1918–2009) was an Australian geneticist specialising in population ecology and was also well known as a theologian, writing widely on the topic of science and religion, winning the Templeton Prize in 1990. The prize recognised his work ascribing intrinsic value to all life.

Early life
Birch was born in Melbourne on 8 February 1918, the son of Harry Birch, a New Zealand-born bank manager with the ES&A Bank, and his Irish-born wife, Nora. He had a twin brother, Sidney, and an older brother, Hugh. Birch attended Scotch College, Melbourne, and focused on agriculture at university in Melbourne.

Birch was educated at University of Melbourne, receiving a Bachelor of Agricultural Science in 1939.  His first job was in the entomology department at the Waite Agricultural Research Institute at the University of Adelaide, where he earned a Doctorate of Science in 1941.

Career
During his six years of entomological research with his then-supervisor, Herbert Andrewartha, with whom he forged a close relationship, Birch demonstrated that external processes, driven by weather and other types of disturbance, were vastly important in controlling the numbers and distribution of animals. This radical challenge to the prevailing views, namely that populations were self-regulating based on competition for limited resources, became one of Birch's major and enduring contributions to the science of ecology.

In 1948, Birch became a senior lecturer in the Department of Zoology at the University of Sydney. Birch was later promoted to Reader in Zoology in 1954, and then the Challis Chair of Biology, which he held for 25 years from 1960 to 1984.

Views
Birch credited Dr Herbert Andrewartha as having a great influence on him, teaching him "to think" and to discover "the social responsibility of the scientist", saying:
In view of the enormous transformation of the modern world as a result of science and technology, the scientist is responsible for much that has happened both good and bad. This understanding is based on the premise that science is not value free.

Death
Birch died on 19 December 2009. He never married. He was survived by his twin, Sidney, and sister-in-law, Jenny.

Publications 
 The Distribution and Abundance of Animals, with H. G. Andrewartha. University of Chicago Press, 1954
 Nature and God, SCM Press, 1965
 Confronting the Future: Australia and the world: the next hundred years, Penguin Books, 1975 (2nd edition 1993) 
 Genetics and the Quality of Life, with Paul Abrecht. Pergamon Press, 1975. 
 Another Australia in a Just and Sustainable Global Society: An Address University of Newcastle, 1976.
 The Liberation of Life: From the Cell to the Community, with John B. Cobb Jr., Cambridge University Press, 1981. 
 The Ecological Web: more on the distribution and abundance of animals, with H. G. Andrewartha. University of Chicago Press, 1984. 
 Liberating Life: Contemporary Approaches to Ecological Theory, Orbis, 1990 
 On Purpose, UNSW Press, 1990.  (published in the US as A Purpose for Everything: Religion in a Postmodern World View, Twentythird Publications, 1990. )
 Regaining Compassion for Humanity and Nature, UNSW Press, 1993.  
 Feelings, UNSW Press, 1995. 
 Living With the Animals: The Community of God's Creatures, with Lukas Vischer. Risk Book Series, World Council of Churches, 1996. 
 Biology and the Riddle of Life, co-published by UNSW Press (Australia), 1999. 
 Life and Work: Challenging Economic Man, with David Paul. UNSW Press, 2003. 
 Science and Soul, co-published by UNSW Press (Australia), 2007 and Templeton Foundation Press (USA), 2008.

References

External links 
 Charles Birch, Australian Biography 
 Why I became a Panexperientialist by Charles Birch
 Charles Birch, Science and Soul. Charles Birch interviewed by Stephen Crittenden on The Religion Report, ABC Radio National, 19 December 2007.
 Obituary, Sydney Morning Herald, 23 December 2009.

1918 births
2009 deaths
Australian geneticists
Fellows of the Australian Academy of Science
Templeton Prize laureates